The 35th Bombardment Squadron is an inactive United States Air Force unit. It was activated in January 1940 as the United States built up its armed forces prior to World War II.  In the fall of 1941, it deployed to the Caribbean and, following the attack on Pearl Harbor engaged in antisubmarine patrols.  Following the transfer of the land based antisubmarine mission to the Navy, and with the lessening of threats to the Panama Canal, the squadron returned to the United States, where it was disbanded in June 1944.

The squadron was reconstituted in 1947 and activated in the reserve, but it does not appear to have been fully manned or equipped before inactivating in 1949.  In 1985, the squadron was consolidated with the 35th Air Defense Missile Squadron, which had provided air defense of the Northeastern United States from its base in northern New York from 1960 to 1969.  The consolidated squadron was designated the 35th Tactical Missile Squadron, but has not been active since consolidation.

History

World War II
The 35th Bombardment Squadron was first organized at Langley Field, Virginia in January 1940 as one of the three original squadrons of the 25th Bombardment Group.  Although activated at Langley and training there, the activation orders anticipated that the squadron was to be stationed at Borinquen Field, Puerto Rico.  The squadron began to equip with Douglas B-18 Bolos in 1941.

The squadron deployed to the Caribbean as part of the 1940 Destroyers for Bases Agreement with the British, departing Langley Field, on 26 October 1940, and was assigned to Coolidge Field, Antigua in the British West Indies (by way of Borinquen Field, Puerto Rico) before the subsequent dispersal of its original personnel and equipment. It had been assigned as a subordinate element of the 25th Bombardment Group.  In May 1942, the unit was re designated as the 35th Bombardment Squadron (Medium).

On 31 October 1942, the first of the confusing reassignments that have tainted the overall picture of USAAF activities in the Caribbean was instituted. At that time, the squadron inherited the personnel and equipment of the 430th Bombardment Squadron (which had formerly been the 44th Reconnaissance Squadron). Additionally, the unit also got the personnel and equipment of the 99th Bombardment Squadron which had been based at  Zandery Field, Surinam.  Its personnel at Zandery becoming "A" and "B" Flight of the squadron, while the former 430th BS personnel and equipment became "C" and "D" Flights.

In January 1943, the Squadron Headquarters was moved from Coolidge Field back to Borinquen Field, Puerto Rico. "B" and "D" Flights of the 417th Bombardment Squadron (Medium) were reassigned to the squadron on 1 May 1943.  In addition, for short periods in January, March, July and August 1943, while the German submarine warfare campaign was most critical, aircraft of the 80th Bombardment Squadron, 10th Bombardment Squadron, 8th Antisubmarine Squadron, 9th Antisubmarine Squadron and the Navy VB 130 were attached and/or operated intermingled with 35th BS aircraft.  Additionally, during August 1943, aircraft and crews of the 23d Antisubmarine Squadron were attached to the 35th.

These reactions to the German threat were brought about, mainly between 19 and 30 July 1943, by new and very bold tactics being displayed by the Axis U-boats, now intent on fighting it out with patrolling aircraft on the surface.  All of this makes it clear that the 35th BS was a prime element in the Allied anti-submarine campaign in the Caribbean. This realization was brought home on 1 August 1943 when operational and administrative control of the Squadron and its several detachments was transferred from the 25th Bombardment Group to Antilles Air Command.

By 31 December 1943 the Navy had taken over the antisubmarine mission and the far-flung detachments were inactivated.  By this time, the unit was little more than an Operational Training Unit.  Although the Squadron was reassigned to Waller Field, Trinidad, nominally, on 7 February 1944, as of 24 March this largely administrative transfer was ended and the Squadron was returned home to the United States. where the designation became that of a B-25 Mitchell Operational Training Unit at Alamagardo Army Air Field, New Mexico

The squadron was disbanded on 20 June 1944.

Air Force reserve
Was activated as an Air Force Reserve squadron in July 1947 at Phillips Field, Maryland.  May have operated some B-25s, although that is undetermined.  Inactivated due to budget restraints in June 1949.

Cold War air defense
The 35th Air Defense Missile Squadron was activated on 1 June 1960 at Niagara Falls Air Force Missile Site, New York and assigned to Syracuse Air Defense Sector of Air Defense Command.  The squadron was equipped with IM-99 BOMARC surface to air missiles and became fully operational in December 1961.  The squadron's missiles were tied into the Semi-Automatic Ground Environment (SAGE) network.  The squadron maintained alert status with its missiles until it was inactivated at the end of December 1969.

The two squadrons were consolidated in September 1985 as the 35th Tactical Missile Squadron.

Lineage
 35th Bombardment Squadron
 Constituted as the 35th Bombardment Squadron (Heavy) on 22 December 1939
 Activated on 1 February 1940
 Redesignated 35th Bombardment Squadron (Medium) on 7 May 1942
 Disbanded on 20 June 1944
 Reconstituted and redesignated 35th Bombardment Squadron, Light on 26 May 1947
 Activated in the reserve on 13 July 1947
 Inactivated on 27 June 1949
 Consolidated with the 35th Air Defense Missile Squadron as the 35th Tactical Missile Squadron on 19 September 1985

 35th Air Defense Missile Squadron
 Constituted as the 35th Air Defense Missile Squadron (BOMARC) on 17 December 1959
 Activated on 1 June 1960
 Inactivated on 31 December 1969
 Consolidated with the 35th Bombardment Squadron as the 35th Tactical Missile Squadron on 19 September 1985

Assignments
 25th Bombardment Group, 1 February 1940 – 20 June 1944
 Eleventh Air Force, 13 July 1947
 322d Bombardment Group, 30 September 1947 – 27 June 1949
 Syracuse Air Defense Sector, 1 June 1960
 Detroit Air Defense Sector, 4 September 1963
 34th Air Division, 1 April 1966
 35th Air Division, 15 September–31 December 1969

Stations
 Langley Field, Virginia, February–26 October 1940
 Borrinquen Field Puerto Rico, 31 October 1941
 Coolidge Field, Antigua, 11 November 1941
 Zandery Field, Surinam, 1 November 1942
 Detachment operated from Atkinson Field, British Guiana, 1 November 1942–c. 7 October 1943
 Detachment operated from Waller Field, Trinidad, 27 August–12 October 1943
 Vernam Field, Jamaica, c. 7 October 1943
 Waller Field, Trinidad, 7 February–24 March 1944
 Alamogordo Army Air Field, New Mexico, April–20 June 1944
 Phillips Field, Maryland, 13 July 1947 – 27 June 1949
 Niagara Falls Air Force Missile Site, New York, 1 June 1960 – 31 December 1969

Aircraft and missiles
 probably Northrop A-17, 1940
 Douglas B-18 Bolo, 1941–1943
 B-25 Mitchell, 1943–1944
 Boeing IM-99 (later CIM-10) BOMARC, 1960–1969

References

Notes
 Explanatory notes

 Citations

Bibliography

 
 
 
 
 
 Hagdedorn, Dan (1995), Alae Supra Canalem: Wings Over the Canal, Turner Publishing,

External links

Military units and formations established in 1940
035
035
Military units and formations in British Guiana in World War II